The Horseshoe Falls of South Africa are located 4 km off the Old Lydenburg Road along the Sabie River in Mpumalanga. These unusual falls, although not very high, are horseshoe shaped and have been declared a national monument. A short walk through an attractive landscape brings the visitor to the cascade-type falls. Here one also has the opportunity to spot some of the local birdlife or other wildlife. Although it is easy to navigate to, a small fee is charged to get into the park where this beautiful attraction may be enjoyed.  Horseshoe Falls is also a popular venue for trout fishing.

Other attractions
The amphitheatre in the uKhahlamba Drakensberg Park, also in South Africa, has massive cliffs that are in the shape of a horseshoe that could be confused as horseshoe falls.

External links 
 Horseshoe Falls on SA Venues
 Horseshoe Falls on SA Travel

References

Waterfalls of South Africa
Landforms of Mpumalanga